The YJ-18 (NATO designation CH-SS-NX-13) is a Chinese family of anti-ship and land attack cruise missiles.

Description

The missile can be launched from vertical launching systems, and possibly from submarine torpedo tubes.

The YJ-18 is deployed aboard the Type 052D destroyer and the Type 055 destroyer.  It may already be carried by the Shang II-class nuclear attack submarine outfitted with VLS cells, will replace the -range YJ-82 aboard the Yuan-class air-independent propulsion (AIP) and Song-class diesel-electric submarines, will likely deploy on the Type 095 submarine, and may be capable of deployment on Kilo-class submarines. A land-based version could replace the subsonic -range YJ-62 with shore batteries.

Variants
YJ-18: Original land-attack variant launched from ships.
YJ-18A: Vertically-launched shipborne anti-ship variant, deployed aboard the Type 052D and Type 055 destroyers.
YJ-18B: Submarine-launched variant.
YJ-18C: Land-attack version launched from shipping containers similar to the Club-K missile system.
Mobile Coastal Variant: Land-based version with unknown designation launched by 12×12 transporter erector launcher (TEL), possibly fitted with a larger booster for increased range.

See also
Related development
YJ-12

Comparable missiles
3M-54 Klub
BrahMos
P-800 Oniks
Perseus (missile)
3M-54 Kalibr

References

Bibliography

Guided missiles of the People's Republic of China
Anti-ship cruise missiles of the People's Republic of China
Weapons of the People's Republic of China
Military equipment introduced in the 2010s